Gibbomesosella laosica is a species of beetle in the family Cerambycidae. It was described by Stephan von Breuning in 1969. It is known from Laos.

References

Pteropliini
Beetles described in 1969